Apollonia was a town of Mygdonia in Macedon, south of Lake Bolbe, and north of the Chalcidian mountains, on the road from Thessalonica to Amphipolis, as we learn from the Acts of the Apostles, and the Itineraries. Pliny the Elder mentions this Apollonia.

The site of Apollonia is near the modern Néa Apollonía.

See also
 List of ancient Greek cities

References

Geography of ancient Mygdonia
New Testament cities
Former populated places in Greece
Populated places in ancient Macedonia